Mato Jajalo (born 25 May 1988) is a Bosnian professional footballer who plays as a defensive midfielder for Serie B club Venezia.

Jajalo started his professional career at Slaven Belupo, before joining Siena in 2009. The following year, he was loaned to 1. FC Köln, with whom he signed permanently a year later. In 2014, he was sent on loan to Sarajevo. Later that year, he was transferred to Rijeka. Jajalo moved to Palermo in 2015. Four years later, he switched to Udinese. In 2023, he joined Venezia.

A former Croatian youth international, Jajalo even made his senior international debut for Croatia, only to switch his allegiance to Bosnia and Herzegovina in 2016, earning 11 caps until 2019.

Club career

Early career
Because of the outbreak of Bosnian War, Jajalo's family fled from his native Bosnia and Herzegovina and moved to Germany, where he started playing football at a local club, before joining youth setup of Croatian team Slaven Belupo in 1999. He made his professional debut against Osijek on 22 July 2007 at the age of 19. On 5 August, he scored his first professional goal in a triumph over Zagreb.

In June 2009, Jajalo was transferred to Italian side Siena.

In July 2010, he was sent on a season-long loan to German club 1. FC Köln, with an option to make the transfer permanent, which was activated the following year. In February 2014, he was loaned to Bosnian outfit Sarajevo until the end of season.

In June, he switched to Rijeka.

Palermo
In January 2015, Jajalo moved to Palermo on a contract until June 2019. He made his official debut for the team on 1 February against Hellas Verona. On 24 May, he scored his first goal for the team in a loss to Fiorentina.

Despite Palermo's relegation to Serie B in April 2017, Jajalo decided to stay at the club.

He played his 100th game for the side against Parma on 2 April 2018.

Udinese
In June 2019, Jajalo signed a three-year deal with Udinese. He made his competitive debut for the club in Coppa Italia game against Südtirol on 18 August. A week later, he made his league debut against Milan.

In December 2020, he suffered a severe knee injury, which was diagnosed as anterior cruciate ligament tear and was ruled out for at least six months. He returned to the pitch on 22 August 2021, over eight months after the injury.

In March 2022, he signed a new one-year contract with the team.

Later stage of career
In January 2023, Jajalo moved to Venezia.

International career
After representing Croatia at various youth levels, Jajalo made his senior international debut in a friendly game against Argentina on 12 November 2014. He also served as captain of the under-21 team under coach Dražen Ladić. However, in March 2016, he decided that he would play for Bosnia and Herzegovina in the future.

In July, his request to change sports citizenship from Croatian to Bosnian was approved by FIFA. Subsequently, in September, he received his first senior call-up, for 2018 FIFA World Cup qualifiers against Belgium and Cyprus. He debuted against the former on 7 October.

Career statistics

Club

International

Honours
Sarajevo
Bosnian Cup: 2013–14

Rijeka
Croatian Super Cup: 2014

References

External links

1988 births
Living people
People from Jajce
Croats of Bosnia and Herzegovina
Bosnia and Herzegovina refugees
Bosnia and Herzegovina emigrants to Germany
Bosnia and Herzegovina emigrants to Croatia
Naturalized citizens of Croatia
Croatian footballers
Croatia youth international footballers
Croatia under-21 international footballers
Croatia international footballers
Croatian expatriate footballers
Bosnia and Herzegovina footballers
Bosnia and Herzegovina international footballers
Bosnia and Herzegovina expatriate footballers
Dual internationalists (football)
Association football midfielders
NK Slaven Belupo players
A.C.N. Siena 1904 players
1. FC Köln players
FK Sarajevo players
HNK Rijeka players
Palermo F.C. players
Udinese Calcio players
Venezia F.C. players
Croatian Football League players
Serie A players
Bundesliga players
2. Bundesliga players
Premier League of Bosnia and Herzegovina players
Serie B players
Expatriate footballers in Croatia
Expatriate footballers in Italy
Expatriate footballers in Germany
Croatian expatriate sportspeople in Italy
Croatian expatriate sportspeople in Germany
Croatian expatriate sportspeople in Bosnia and Herzegovina
Bosnia and Herzegovina expatriate sportspeople in Croatia
Bosnia and Herzegovina expatriate sportspeople in Italy
Bosnia and Herzegovina expatriate sportspeople in Germany